Schwalmtal can refer to two municipalities in Germany:

 Schwalmtal, North Rhine-Westphalia, in the district of Viersen, North Rhine-Westphalia
 Schwalmtal, Hesse, in Vogelsbergkreis, Hesse